The Berber flag (Berber language: Akenyal Amaziɣ, ⴰⴾⴻⵏⵢⴰⵍ ⴰⵎⴰⵣⵉⵗ) or Amazigh flag is a flag that has been adopted by many Berber populations including protestors, cultural and political activists.

The flag was inaugurated in Wadya, a town of Kabylia situated in Tizi Ouzou, a province of Algeria, by an elder Algerian Kabylian veteran, Youcef Medkour.

History

Mohand Arav Bessaoud, Algerian activist and founder of Berber Academy, designed the flag in 1970. It was used in demonstrations in the 1980s, and in 1997, the World Amazigh Congress at Tafira on Las Palmas in the Canary Islands made the flag official.

Description
The flag is composed of blue, green, and yellow horizontal bands of the same height, and a Tifinagh letter yaz or aza. Each colour corresponds to an aspect of Tamazgha, the territory inhabited by the Berbers in North Africa:
 Blue represents the sea.
 Green represents the mountains.
 Yellow represents the desert.
 The red of the letter z (ⵣ in Tifinagh) represents resistance and the martyrs/free man of the Imazighen.

The letter z represents the word Amazigh, the root of which it is taken from.

See also

Berberism
 Berber latin alphabet
Tifinagh
Berber mythology
Mohand Arav Bessaoud

References

External links

Flag
Berberism
Flags of indigenous peoples
Proposed flags
Ethnic flags
Flags introduced in 1998